North Louisiana History is an academic journal published twice annually in Shreveport, Louisiana by the North Louisiana Historical Association (NLHA).

History
The origin of North Louisiana History parallels the history of the NLHA itself, which was organized in 1952 at Methodist-affiliated Centenary College in Shreveport.

The NLHA founding members included Mrs. D. H. Perkins and Dr. A. W. Shaw. The organization awards the Overdyke Awards for its best published research paper in memory of W. Darrell Overdyke, a Centenary College history professor. With time, the associational publications became more formal, and the NLHA became a non-profit organization. The NLHA seeks to collect and preserve historical material about North Louisiana and under editorial review considers articles for publication from professional historians, lay historians, and students. According to the historian B. H. Gilley (1927-2017), formerly of the Louisiana Tech University faculty, "a wealth of research has been written and preserved in [the NLHA] publications".

North Louisiana Historical Association bulletin 
A bulletin was edited from 1956 to 1958 by J. A. Manry (1903–1993). Manry was a journalist, regional scholar, and an historian. Other names for the Bulletin that might be found in citations are:
Bulletin (North Louisiana Historical Association) (the uniform title)
North Louisiana Historical Association bulletin
North Louisiana Historical Association Bulletin
Bulletin of the North Louisiana Historical Association
The Bulletin
Bulletin

North Louisiana Historical Association news letter 
From 1959 to 1969, NLHA published a newsletter. The editor was Max Bradbury, who with the Bradbury Award is still recognized annually for the "most outstanding article" published in North Louisiana History. Names for the newsletter that might be cited are:
Newsletter (North Louisiana Historical Association) (this is the uniform title)
North Louisiana Historical Association Newsletter
North Louisiana Historical Association news letter 
Newsletter

Journal of the North Louisiana Historical Association 
Beginning in the Fall of 1969, Morgan D. Peoples of Ruston, then a member of the Louisiana Tech History Department, became the editor and founded the journal. Under the original title, Journal of the North Louisiana Historical Association, the journal was published quarterly from 1969 through 1998. This journal is cited under a number of similar titles:
Journal (North Louisiana Historical Association) (the uniform title)
Journal of the North Louisiana Historical Association
North Louisiana Historical Association journal
Journal / North La. Hist. Assoc
J North La Hist Assoc
Journal 
Journal - North Louisiana Historical Association

North Louisiana History 
Ending with Volume 29, No. 4 (Fall 1998) and beginning with Volume 30, No. 1 (Winter 1999), the journal was retitled North Louisiana History.

Today 
The publication is currently edited by Kathleen Smith, an English professor at Louisiana State University in Shreveport. The printing press for the journal is named in honor of the late Louisiana Tech professor and regional historian John Ardis Cawthon.

The journal accepts articles for possible publication which focus on any part of Louisiana north of and including Alexandria. An index of articles published between 1970 and 2005 is available online. In addition to its scholarly articles, the journal recently began accepting personal reminiscences and essays relative to regional history, an art that Cawthon particularly pioneered during the 1970s.

Louisiana State University in Shreveport (LSUS) supports the journal with office space and a dedicated library collection as part of the LSUS Archives and Special Collections at the Noel Memorial Library, including an online list of journal articles. As of 1970, and still today, Centenary College holds an archive of historical NLHA material. Starting in 1970, articles published in the journal have been abstracted and cited in America: History and Life, Historical Abstracts.

References

Bibliography

North Louisiana Historical Association. Shreveport Medical Society. & Medical History Club of Shreveport. (1986). History of medicine in North Louisiana: Symposium : Papers. North Louisiana Historical Association.

External links 
 

History of the United States journals
English-language journals
History of Louisiana
Biannual journals
Mass media in Shreveport, Louisiana
Publications established in 1969